Business Park Skejby is a large business park in the northern district of Aarhus N, in the city of Aarhus, Denmark. 

Business Park Skejby was officially created in 2013 and stretches north from the neighbourhood of Christiansbjerg to Skejby, bounded by the major roads of Ring 2 and Randersvej. Most of the businesses and institutions within the park area were constructed several decades ago.

Description
Apart from small and large businesses, the business park area is also home to the smaller business park of Agro Food Park, a large number of educational facilities and a few residential areas as well. Major institutions, most of which predates 2013, includes:

 The New University Hospital (DNU)
 NRGi headquarters. NRGi is a large Danish coop energy company.
 Vestas Wind Systems, headquarters
 IBM, Danish headquarters
 Olympus
 Danmarks Radio, Jutland department
 Danish School of Journalism, the Aarhus campus of the Danish School of Media and Journalism.
 VIA University College, Campus Aarhus N
 SOSU aarhus educational centre for social- and healthcareworkers
 INCUBA Science Park, headquarters
 Agro Food Park
 Aarhus Skøjtehal, an indoor ice skating rink
 Aarhus Academy
 Aarhus Tech, main campus

Landmarks for the area includes Aarhus Vandtårn, a former water tower in red brick with a bright green copper roof, the nature site of Vestereng - a former military training ground -, and the old village of Skejby with an old white-washed village church.

Business Park Skejby has its headquarters outside the park in the library and culture centre of Dokk1 at the harbourfront.

Transportation 
The business park is located at the outer ring road of Ring 2 (Hasle Ringvej) and the intercity motorway of Randersvej, with easy access to all of Aarhus. 

Since December 2017, the business park has been connected to the inner city, including the business park headquarters and the central station, by the Aarhus light rail, an electric tram system.

References

External links 

  

Business parks of Denmark
2013 establishments in Denmark
Aarhus N
Companies based in Aarhus
Business organizations based in Denmark